A hudd is a shelter used during funeral services.

Hudd may also refer to:
Bill Hudd (fl. 1925), Australian Rules footballer
Damien Hudd (born 1981), Welsh rugby player
Roy Hudd (1936–2020), English comedian
Thomas R. Hudd (1835 – 1896), U.S. Congressman
Walter Hudd (1897 – 1963), British actor

See also
HUD (disambiguation)